The dolabra is a versatile axe used by the people of Italy since ancient times. The dolabra could serve as a pickaxe used by miners and excavators, a priest's implement for ritual religious slaughtering of animals and as an entrenching tool (mattock) used in Roman infantry tactics. In the 1st century CE, at the battle of Augustodunum, armoured Gallic gladiators were defeated by legionaries wielding dolabrae.

Gnaeus Domitius Corbulo said, "you defeat the enemy with a pickaxe".

See also
 Digging stick
 Pulaski

Bibliography
Adrian Goldsworthy, The Complete Roman Army
Strauss, Barry S. The Spartacus War. Simon & Schuster, 2009. Print.

References

Hand tools
Ancient Roman tools
Ancient Roman legionary equipment